Stover William McIlwain (September 22, 1939 – January 15, 1966), nicknamed "Smokey", was an American professional baseball player. A right-handed pitcher, he appeared in two games for the 1957–58 Chicago White Sox, making his Major League debut just three days after his 18th birthday. He graduated from J. M. Tate High School in Gonzalez, Florida, and attended Rollins College.

In the latter game, McIlwain allowed a home run to Lou Klimchock, the game's leadoff batter, but then settled down to pitch four innings without further scoring, allowing four hits and no bases on balls. He left for a pinch hitter in the home half of the fourth inning with a 2–1 lead and Chicago eventually won 11–4.

In his two big league appearances and five innings pitched, McIlwain did not record a win or a loss, gave up six hits and just the one earned run for a lifetime earned run average of 1.80. He notched four strikeouts, all during his 1958 starting assignment. His minor league pitching career, spent entirely in the White Sox' farm system, extended from 1957 through 1963, with 1961–62 spent in military service.

McIlwain died in Buffalo, New York, from testicular cancer at the age of 26 and was interred in Spruell Memorial Cemetery, Cantonment, Florida.

References

External links
Baseball Reference
Sullivan, Josh, Stover McIlwain. SABR Biography Project

1939 births
1966 deaths
Baseball players from Savannah, Georgia
Charleston ChaSox players
Charleston White Sox players
Chicago White Sox players
Davenport DavSox players
Deaths from cancer in New York (state)
Deaths from testicular cancer
Eugene Emeralds players
Lynchburg White Sox players
Major League Baseball pitchers
Rollins Tars baseball players